Park Byung-hyun (born 28 March 1993) is a South Korean footballer who plays as defender.

Career
Park joined K League 1 side Busan IPark before 2016 season starts.

References

1993 births
Living people
Association football defenders
South Korean footballers
Daegu FC players
Busan IPark players
Gimcheon Sangmu FC players
K League 1 players
K League 2 players
Korea National League players